The Struggle is the third studio album by American rapper and Wu-Tang Clan member Cappadonna. The album was one of the two solo albums released from the Clan on October 7, 2003 (the other one was RZA's third studio album Birth of a Prince)

Track listing 
 "Intro"  – 0:16       
 "Cap Is Back" (feat. Lounge Mode) – 3:29       
 "Role of a Lifetime" (feat. Solomon Childs) – 3:14       
 "Blood Brothers" (feat. Lounge Mode) – 3:14       
 "Mamma" (Skit)  – 0:18       
 "Mamma"  – 2:53       
 "Do It/Push"  – 3:08       
 "Get Away from the Door" (feat. Inspectah Deck) – 2:58       
 "Money, Cash, Flows" (feat. Lounge Mode, Crunch Lo and Remedy) – 3:20       
 "I Don't Even Know You" – 2:25       
 "Make Money Money" (Skit)  – 0:11       
 "Season of da' Vick" (feat. Lounge Mode) – 3:12       
 "Killa Killa Hill" (feat. Raekwon) – 3:37       
 "Broken Glass"  – 2:44       
 "Power to the Peso" (feat. Lounge Mode, Shaun Wigz and Solomon Childs) – 3:14       
 "Life of a Lesbo" – 3:44       
 "Pain Is Love" (feat. Lounge Mode and Solomon Childs) – 3:19       
 "Show" (Skit) – 1:00       
 "My Kinda Bitch" – 2:30       
 "We Got This" (feat. Polite, Lounge Mode and Remedy)  – 4:08       
 "Struggle with This" (feat. King Just) – 3:29

References

2003 albums
Cappadonna albums
Albums produced by 4th Disciple